Glyptoparus delicatulus, the delicate blenny, is a species of combtooth blenny found in coral reefs in the western Pacific and Indian Oceans.  This species reaches a length of  TL.  It can be found in the aquarium trade.  This is the only known species in its genus.

References

External links
 

Salarinae
Monotypic fish genera
Fish described in 1959